Lovely But Deadly is a 1981 action film about a cheerleader who goes undercover to fight drug dealers. The film stars Lucinda Dooling, John Randolph, Mel Novak and Richard Herd.

Directed by David Sheldon with a story by Lawrence D. Foldes, the film follows Mary Ann "Lovely" Lovitt (Dooling), who goes back to high school to find the drug pushers that she holds responsible for the death of her brother, who died from an overdose.

The film features several fight scenes, with Lovitt using kung fu to deal with an array of villains.

It was subsequently released on VHS by Vestron Video.

Reception
Daniel R. Budnik, in his book 80s Action Movies on the Cheap, calls the film "enjoyable" but "schizophrenic", stating "the film's style changes so much there could be ten directors involved". Shock Cinema called it an "amusingly braindead romp".

Principal cast
Lucinda Dooling as Mary Ann Lovitt
John Randolph as Franklin van Dyke
Mel Novak as Warren Lang
Susan Mechsner as Suzie
Richard Herd as "Honest Charley" Gilmarten

References

External links
 
 

1981 films
1981 action films
American martial arts films
1980s English-language films
American films about revenge
American exploitation films
1981 martial arts films
Films scored by Robert O. Ragland
American vigilante films
Teensploitation
1980s American films